Michael Patrick Doyle is an microbiologist. He is an emeritus Regents Professor of Food Microbiology at the University of Georgia's College of Agricultural and Environmental Sciences and the former director of the college's Center for Food Safety, where he researched foodborne bacterial pathogens. He developed patents to several food safety interventions, including one used as a meat wash. He was a founding editor of the Annual Review of Food Science and Technology in 2010  continuing through 2021.

Education
Doyle graduated from the University of Wisconsin-Madison with a B.S. degree in Bacteriology (1973), followed by an M.S. (1975) and Ph.D. (1977) in Food Microbiology under the direction of UW professor and adviser Dr. Elmer Marth.

Doyle is a member of the American Academy of Microbiology; the American Association for the Advancement of Science; the American Society for Microbiology; the International Association for Food Protection; the Institute of Medicine of the National Academies; the National Academy of Inventors;Phi Kappa Phi; Sigma Xi; and Gamma Sigma Delta.

References

External links
profile University of Georgia Center for Food Safety

Living people
American microbiologists
University of Wisconsin–Madison College of Agricultural and Life Sciences alumni
Year of birth missing (living people)
Annual Reviews (publisher) editors